Oleh Sobekh (born June 6, 1976) is a retired Soviet and Ukrainian football player.

Career
Oleh Sobekh started his career in 1993 with Desna Chernihiv, where he played until December 1997 where he played 113 matches and scored 5 goals and in the season 1996–97 with the club of Chernihiv he won the Ukrainian Second League. In January 1998 he played 16 matches with Slavutich-Chernobyl. In 1998 he returned to Desna Chernihiv where he played 15 matches and scored 2 goals. Then he moved to Volyn Lutsk where he played 33 matches and scored 2 goals. In 2000 he returned again to Desna Chernihiv where he played 13 matches and scored 2 goals. He also played 6 matches for Volyn Lutsk. In 2001 he returned to Desna Chernihiv for two seasons and he played 33 matches and scored 1 goal. In 2003 he moved to FC Nizhyn, where stayed until 2007 and he played 15 matches.

Honours
Volyn Lutsk
 Ukrainian First League: 2001–02

Desna Chernihiv
 Ukrainian Second League: 1996–97

References

External links 
 Oleh Sobekh footballfacts.ru

1976 births
Living people
Footballers from Chernihiv
Soviet footballers
FC Desna Chernihiv players
FC Slavutych players
FC Volyn Lutsk players
Ukrainian footballers
Ukrainian Second League players
Association football midfielders